Route 6 is a  state highway in the northern part of the U.S. state of Missouri. Route 6, if only a few miles longer in each direction, would be the only state highway to cross Missouri west to east. It is one of the original 1922 highways in Missouri.

Route description

Major intersections

See also

References

006
Transportation in Buchanan County, Missouri
Transportation in DeKalb County, Missouri
Transportation in Daviess County, Missouri
Transportation in Grundy County, Missouri
Transportation in Sullivan County, Missouri
Transportation in Adair County, Missouri
Transportation in Knox County, Missouri
Transportation in Lewis County, Missouri
St. Joseph, Missouri metropolitan area
St. Joseph, Missouri
Kirksville micropolitan area, Missouri